Lizzie Borden (1860–1927) was an American woman accused and acquitted of murdering her father and stepmother.

Lizzie Borden or Lizzy Borden may also refer to:

 Lizzie Borden (director) (born 1958), American filmmaker
 Lizzy Borden (actress), American pornographic actress and former wrestler 
 Lizzy Borden (band), American heavy metal band
 Lizzie Borden (opera), opera by Jack Beeson

Borden, Lizzie